Georgina de Swert Burrull, known as "Gina", (born on 6 October 1982 in Sant Cugat del Vallès) is a Spanish rugby player and coach.

Career 
She played with the Spain women's national rugby union team. She participated in the 2006 Women's Rugby World Cup, and the 2006 Women's Six Nations Championship. She played rugby sevens, competing with the national team in the 2009 Rugby World Cup Sevens.

She trained at INEF Barcelona, playing the wing position. She won four Copes de la Reina (2005, 2006, 2007 and 2009), and five Catalan Championships.

She is considered one of the founders of the Club de Rugby Sant Cugat, which she coached.

References 

1982 births
Living people
Spanish rugby union players
Spanish rugby union coaches
Spanish rugby sevens players
People from Sant Cugat del Vallès